Seagate SeaShield was a physical electrostatic protection shield feature of Seagate Medalist series hard drives, and followed by the Barracuda series of hard disk drives.

Physical characteristics
There are two types of Sea Shield:

The first version of the shield is made of two pieces. The top is made of metal and serves as physical protection for the electronics. The other half is mounted on the bottom side of hard drive, and is fastened with a metal hook to the electronics board with two Torx screws. The metal shield covers the electronic circuit and electronic cables leading to the hard disk drive motor and drive head. Below the metal shield, there is a layer of foam, which serves as the actual electrostatic protection.

The second version of the shield is included on many models from the U series. This one-piece approach replaced the metal and foam with rubber. However, this version was a bit less intelligible as rubber is also a heat insulator and has been blamed for failures of aging drives.

Other purpose

The metal shield is covered with a plastic label, which contains instructions on disk installation, and various physical jumper setups.

Future
The SeaShield has disappeared from modern hard drives, and although no other hard drive manufacturer has ever used similar protection on their hard drives, some companies such as WiebeTech Micro Storage Solutions do offer a plate which can be screwed onto the bottom of SATA or IDE drives, protecting the circuitry.

External resources
 Seagate Barracuda SATA V Review https://web.archive.org/web/20020918012352/http://www.lostcircuits.com/advice/sata150/10.shtml
 Russian Baracuda SATA Review http://www.composter.ru/Environ/wa/Main?textid=3792&level1=articles 
 WiebeTech Misc Products and Accessories (with pricing) http://www.wiebetech.com/products/misc.php 

Computer storage devices
Hard disk drives